Tempest is a 1982 American adventure comedy-drama romance film directed by Paul Mazursky. It is a loosely based, modern-day adaptation of the William Shakespeare play The Tempest.  The picture features John Cassavetes, Gena Rowlands, Susan Sarandon, Raúl Juliá and Molly Ringwald in her feature film debut.

Plot
Phillip Dimitrius is a middle-aged N.Y.C architect who is going through a difficult mid-life crisis.

After learning that his wife Antonia has been having an affair with his boss, Alonzo, Phillip leaves New York City and travels to Greece with his teenage daughter, Miranda. In Athens, he meets Aretha Tomalin, a singer, and they become lovers.  To escape Alonzo and his wife, who also come to Greece, they move to a remote Greek island.   Phillip takes a vow of celibacy after they move to the island.

On the island, they encounter Kalibanos, an eccentric hermit, who was previously its only resident.

Phillip finally seems happy, until one day Alonzo, Antonia and others are spotted in a boat approaching the island. A storm, apparently called up by Phillip, shipwrecks the boat and the passengers land on the island.  Phillip and Antonia reconcile, and they leave the island together with Miranda.

Cast
 John Cassavetes as Phillip Dimitrius
 Gena Rowlands as Antonia Dimitrius
 Susan Sarandon as Aretha Tomalin
 Vittorio Gassman as Alonzo
 Raúl Juliá as Kalibanos
 Molly Ringwald as Miranda Dimitrius
 Sam Robards as Freddy
 Paul Stewart as Phillip's Father
 Jackie Gayle as Trinc
 Anthony Holland as Sebastian
 Jerry Hardin as Harry Gondorf
 Paul Mazursky as Terry Bloomfield
 Lucianne Buchanan as Dolores
 Vassilis Glezakos as Captain
 Luigi Laezza as Sailor
 Sergio Nicolai as Sailor
 Cookie Mueller as New Year's Eve Party Girl

Background

The picture was filmed on location, including: Alypa Beach on the Mani Peninsula of the Peloponnesus; Athens, Greece; Atlantic City, New Jersey; and New York City, New York. Susan Sarandon’s character’s last name, Tomalin, is her own maiden name. She took her husband’s last name when she married Chris Sarandon.

The film contains multiple scenes in which the World Trade Center is visible, including a flyover of New York City near the end of the film when Philip, Antonia and Miranda travel back to New York. The aerial footage is accompanied by the song Manhattan, sung by Dinah Washington.

Distribution
The film premiered in the United States on August 13, 1982.

It was screened at various film festivals, including: the Venice Film Festival, Italy; the Toronto International Film Festival, Canada; the Davao City Film Festival, Philippines; and others.

Reception

Critical response
On Rotten Tomatoes the film has a rotten rating of 55% from 11 reviews. Vincent Canby, film critic for The New York Times, was harsh in his review.  He praised Paul Mazursky for some of his earlier works but Canby did not like this film, and wrote, "Tempest is an overblown, fancified freak of a film. Experiencing it is like watching a 10-ton canary as it attempts to become airborne. It lumbers up and down the runway tirelessly, but never once succeeds in getting both feet off the ground at the same time. The spectacle is amusing in isolated moments but, finally, exhausting."<ref>Canby, Vincent.</blockquote> The New York Times film review, August 13, 1982.</ref> Roger Ebert gave it zero stars, writing: "The movie is an ambitious experiment, but a long and tedious one, and our revels end long before Mazursky's."

Box office 

The film was a box office flop.

Accolades
Wins
 Toronto International Film Festival: People's Choice Award, Paul Mazursky; 1982.
 Venice Film Festival: Pasinetti Award - Best Actress, Susan Sarandon; 1982.

Nominations
 Golden Globe Awards: Golden Globe; Best Actor in a Supporting Role, Raul Julia; New Star of the Year in a Motion Picture - Female, Molly Ringwald; 1983.
 Young Artist Awards: Best Young Supporting Actor in a Motion Picture, Sam Robards; Best Young Supporting Actress in a Motion Picture, Molly Ringwald;  1983.

See also
 List of William Shakespeare film adaptations
 World Trade Center in film

References

External links

 
 
 
 
 
 

1982 films
1982 comedy-drama films
American films based on plays
Columbia Pictures films
1980s English-language films
Films based on The Tempest
Films directed by Paul Mazursky
Films shot in Greece
Films shot in Athens
Films set on islands
Films set in the Mediterranean Sea
Films set in Greece
American comedy-drama films
Midlife crisis films
Modern adaptations of works by William Shakespeare
1980s American films
Toronto International Film Festival People's Choice Award winners